The Stonehenge is a residential apartment building on Boulevard East in the Woodcliff section of North Bergen, New Jersey in the United States. The 34-story building has 356 apartments and 5 levels of indoor parking.

Stonehenge incident

The "Stonehenge Incident" or the "North Hudson Park UFO sightings" occurred on January 12, 1975. According to George O'Barski, while driving he heard static over his radio and saw in North Hudson Park a dark, round "spacecraft" with brightly lit windows hovering over the ground. Ten small, hooded, identically-dressed figures emerged from the UFO, dug up soil and collected it in bags before returning to the craft. O'Barski returned to the site the next day and found the holes. Months later, O'Barski told the story to ufologist Budd Hopkins, who with other ufologists found independent witnesses (including a doorman at the Stonehenge) who also reported sighting the UFO. The incident was reported by Hopkins in The Village Voice, his 1981 book Missing Time, and also in local newspapers.

See also
List of tallest buildings in North Hudson
Galaxy Towers
WOR TV Tower

References 

Buildings and structures in Hudson County, New Jersey
Residential buildings completed in 1967
Skyscrapers in New Jersey
North Hudson, New Jersey
Towers in New Jersey
Modernist architecture in New Jersey
Apartment buildings in New Jersey
North Bergen, New Jersey
Round buildings
Residential skyscrapers in New Jersey